Teer is an unincorporated community in southwestern Orange County, North Carolina, United States, northeast of Oaks. Its elevation is 486 feet or 148 meters.

References

Unincorporated communities in Orange County, North Carolina
Unincorporated communities in North Carolina
Teer Counter, Bhutan Teer Result

lottery sambad today, dear lottery